Saint Pepin or Saint Pépin may refer to:

 Saint Pepin of Landen
 St. Pepin (grape), a grape variety

See also
 Pippin (disambiguation)